The Mount of the Congregation in the Old Testament, has been supposed to refer to the place where God met with angels in the uttermost north of the 3rd Heaven, first and second heavens being earth's atmosphere and outerspace 
respectively i.e., the mount of the Divine presence. This position is agreed upon by various Biblical commentators, from Rashi to Matthew Henry.

See also
 Mount Meru
 Mount Olympus

References

Hebrew Bible mountains